Mike is a masculine given name. It is also encountered as an abbreviation or shorthand for Michael. Notable people with the name include:

People
Mike Adenuga, Nigerian billionaire businessman
Mike Affleck, American football player
Mike Akiu (born 1962), American football player and coach
Mike Aldrete, American baseball player and coach
Mike Alford (born 1943), American football player
Mike Alstott, American football player
Mike Ashley (businessman), British businessman
Mike Ashley (writer) (born 1948), British author and anthology editer
Mike Atkinson (born 1994), English–Belizean footballer
Mike Barnett (disambiguation), several people
Mike Baumann, American baseball player
Mike Beebe, American attorney
Mike Bercovici, American football player
Mike Bloomberg, American businessman and 2020 Democratic presidential candidate
Mike Bloomfield, American musician
Mike Boone, American football player
Mike Bossy (1957–2022), Canadian National Hockey League player
Mike Breen, American sportscaster
Mike Brosseau, American baseball player
Mike Brown (disambiguation), multiple people
Mike Bryan, American professional tennis player
Mike Burkhead, American football player
Mike Cameron, American baseball player
Mike Carp, American Major League Baseball player
Mike Carter, several people
Mike Clevinger, American baseball player
Mike Conley Jr., American basketball player
Michael Cox (disambiguation), several people
Mike Crumb (born 1970), Canadian football player
Mike Conway (born 1983), British race car driver
Mike Cernovich (born 1977), American social media personality, writer and conspiracy theorist
Mike D (born 1965), American musician and founding member of The Beastie Boys
Mike D'Antoni (born 1951), American basketball coach
Mike Danna (born 1997), American football player
James "Mike" DeBardeleben (1940–2011), American rapist and possible serial killer
Mike DeWine, American politician and 70th Governor of Ohio
Mike Dibb (born 1940), English documentary filmmaker 
Mike Dirnt (born 1972), bassist for Green Day
Mike Ditka, American football player and coach
Mike Dierickx, aka M.I.K.E., Belgian progressive trance DJ/producer
Mike Eghan, Ghanaian radio broadcaster
Mike Enriquez, Filipino journalist
Mike Enzi, American politician
Mike Epstein, American Major League Baseball first baseman
Mike Fetters, American baseball player and coach
Mike Fisher (disambiguation), several people
Mike Ford (disambiguation), several people
Mike Franks (tennis), American tennis player
Mike Friede, American football player
Mike Gartner (born 1959), Canadian National Hockey League player
Mike George (radio presenter), British radio presenter
Mike Gesicki, American football player
Mike Gibbins (1949–2005), Welsh drummer, member of the rock band Badfinger
Mike Glennon, American football player
Mike Green (disambiguation), several people
Mike Harkey, American baseball player and coach
Mike Harley Jr. (born 1997), American football player
Mike Hartman, American National Hockey League player
Mike Hibler, American football player
Mike Huckabee, American politician
Mike Hughes (American football) (born 1997), American football player
Mike Hunt (disambiguation), several people
Mike Ilitch, American entrepreneur
Mike Jones (disambiguation), several people
Mike Joyce (musician) (born 1963), English drummer for The Smiths
Mike Judge (born 1962), American cartoonist, animator, voice actor and comedian
Mike Kellogg (American football), American football player
Mike Kennerty, guitarist of the band The All-American Rejects
Mike Kreger, former drummer for Michigan heavy metal band Battlecross
Mike Krüger (born 1951), German comedian and singer 
Mike Largey (born 1960), American basketball player in the Israeli Basketball Premier League
Mike Lenzly, British basketball player
Mike Levenseller, American football player
Mike Lieberthal, American Major League Baseball catcher
Mike Little, British web developer, co-founder of WordPress
Mike Love, American singer and songwriter who co-founded The Beach Boys
Mike Love (American football) (born 1994), American football player
Mike Lynn (basketball) (born 1945), American basketball player
Mike Mayers, American baseball player
Mike McCarthy (born 1963), American football coach
Mike McCready, guitarist of the band Pearl Jam
Mike McGlinchey (offensive lineman), American football player
Mike McLaughlin (born 1956), American racing driver
Mike Miles (disambiguation), several people
Mike Minor (disambiguation), several people
Mike Mizanin, American professional wrestler who is better known by his ring name "The Miz"
Mike Modano (born 1970), American National Hockey League player
Mike Morrison, several people
Mike Moser (born 1990), American basketball player
Mike Moura, Portuguese footballer
Mike Moustakas, American baseball player
Mike Mucitelli, American mixed martial artist
Mike Muscala, Oklahoma City Thunder player
Mike Myers, Canadian-British-American actor, comedian, screenwriter, director, and film producer
Mike Napoli, American baseball player and coach
Mike Nifong (born 1950), American district attorney disbarred for misconduct in the Duke lacrosse case
Mike Nott, American football player
Mike Oldfield, English multi-instrumentalist, known for his 1973 album Tubular Bells
Mike Oliveira, Brazilian professional boxer
Mike Oliver (disability advocate), British sociologist and disability advocate
Mike Oliver (field hockey) (born 1973), Canadian hockey player
Mike O'Malley, American game show host
Mike Ozdowski, American football player
Mike Parson, American politician
Mike Pence, American politician and 48th Vice President of the United States
Mike Polk, American comedian
Mike Pollock (rugby league), New Zealand rugby league footballer of the 1910s and 1920s
Mike Pollock (voice actor), American voice actor
Mike Pompeo (born 1963), American politician and former Secretary of State of the United States
Mike Porcaro (1955–2015), American bassist, member of the rock band Toto
Mike Portnoy, drummer for Neal Morse band and former drummer and founding member of Dream Theater
Mike Posner, American singer-songwriter, musician, and record producer
Mike Purcell, American football player
Mike Rabelo, American baseball player and coach
Mike Rawlings, American politician
Mike Redmond, American baseball player and coach
Mike Rhodes (American football), American football player
Mike Rose (disambiguation), several people
Mike Rosenberg, better known by his stage name Passenger, English singer-songwriter and musician
Mike Rosenthal (born 1977), American football player
Mike Rossman (Michael Albert DiPiano) (born 1955), American world champion light heavyweight boxer
Mike Rowe (born 1962), American television personality
Mike Rowe (ice hockey) (born 1965), Canadian ice hockey player
Mike Rowe (racing driver), American racing driver
Mike Rutherford (born 1950), British progressive rock guitarist
Mike Sanders (basketball) (born 1960), American basketball player and coach
Mike Sarbaugh, Baseball coach
Mike Schwartz, several people
Mike Schmidt, American professional baseball player for the Philadelphia Phillies
Mike Seidman, American football player
Mike Shinoda, vocalist and rhythm guitarist of the band Linkin Park
Mike Siani (baseball), American baseball player
Mike Skinner (musician) (born 1979), British rapper, singer-songwriter, musician, and record producer
Mike Skinner (racing driver) (born 1957), American racing driver
Mike Smith, several people
Mike Stefanik (1958–2019), American racing driver
Mike Strachan (disambiguation), several people
Mike Taylor (basketball coach), American basketball coach
Mike Torres, Dominican basketball player
Mike Townsend, American football player
Mike Trainor, American comedian
Mike Trigg, American football player
Mike Trout, Major League Baseball player
Mike Tyson, American world champion heavyweight boxer
Mike Tyson (American football) (born 1993), American football player
Mike Veisor (born 1952), Canadian National Hockey League player
Mike Vick (born 1980), American football player
Mike Wallace (disambiguation), several people
Mike Weber (American football) (born 1997), American football player
Mike White (quarterback) (born 1995), American football player
Mike Whitmarsh (1962–2009), American volleyball and basketball player
Mike Whitney (born 1959), Australian television personality and former cricketer
Mike Whitwell, American football player
Mike Williams (wide receiver, born 1994) (born 1994), American football player
Mike Will Made It, American music producer and rapper
Mike Witteck, American football player
Mike Yastrzemski, American baseball player
Mike Young (American football), American football player
Mike Zambidis, Greek kickboxing wrestler notable for the high number of KO wins
Mike Zunino, American baseball player
Mike (Brazilian footballer) (born 1993), full name Mike dos Santos Nenatarvicius, Brazilian football forward

Maidhc
Maidhc Ó Flaithearta, Irish Fenian and Land-Leaguer
Maidhc Ó Sé, Irish sportsman

Fictional characters
 Mike, a character in 1993 action/martial arts movie Showdown
 Mike Asparagus, a character and Junior's dad in VeggieTales
 Mike Bison, the Japanese name of Balrog (Street Fighter)
 Mike Donovan, a character in the American TV miniseries V (1983 miniseries)
 Mike Ehrmantraut, a supporting character from Breaking Bad and Better Call Saul
 Mike Fernandez, the Green Ranger in Power Rangers Samurai
 Mike, the main character in the Nintendo video games such as the StarTropics Series and Battle Clash/Metal Combat: Falcon's Revenge
 Mike, in the animated television series Total Drama: Revenge of the Island and Total Drama All-Stars
MIKE, a character from Twin Peaks
 Mike, a blue karaoke robot in the WarioWare series
 Mike Mazinsky, character in Mike, Lu & Og
 Mike Banning, the main character in Has Fallen film series
 Michael "Mike" Corbett/Magna Defender, in Power Rangers Lost Galaxy
Mike Dallas in Degrassi: The Next Generation
 Mike Hammer (character), a private detective created by Mickey Spillane
 Mike Harper, a character from the game Call of Duty: Black Ops II
Mike Lane (Magic Mike), male stripper
 Mike Morton, a survivor in the video game Identity V
 Michael "Mike" Munroe, one of the primary protagonists in the video game Until Dawn
 Mike Newton, a character in the novel series Twilight
 Mike O'Donnell/Mark Gold, a character in the 2009 American fantasy comedy movie 17 Again
 Michael "Mike" Ross, a main character in the television series Suits
 Mike, a small red Arlesdale Railway engine, in The Railway Series by the Rev W. Awdry and the spin-off television series Thomas and Friends
 Mike Schmidt, protagonist of the horror game Five Nights at Freddy's
 Mike Teavee, a Charlie and the Chocolate Factory character
 Mike Wazowski, a green, one-eyed monster, a main character in the Monsters, Inc. franchise
 Mike Watson, a character in 100 Feet
 Mike Wheeler, a main character in the television series Stranger Things
 Mike Zacharias, character of the anime Attack on Titan

See also
Big Mike (nickname)
List of people with given name Michael

English-language masculine given names
Lists of people by nickname
Hypocorisms
English masculine given names